Pyramidella minor is a species of sea snail, a marine gastropod mollusk in the family Pyramidellidae, the pyrams and their allies.

Distribution
The type specimen of this marine species was found off Port Alfred, South Africa.

References

External links
 Smith, E. A. (1904). On a collection of marine shells from Port Alfred, Cape Colony. Journal of Malacology. 11 (2): 21-44, pls 2-3.
 Barnard, K. H. (1963). Contributions to the knowledge of South African marine Mollusca. Part III. Gastropoda: Prosobranchiata: Taenioglossa. i>Annals of the South African Museum 47(1): 1-199

 

Pyramidellidae
Gastropods described in 1904